QIK (Qantas Intelligent Keypad) is an intelligent airline agent application first developed in the late 1980s as a front end to mainframe computer reservations systems.

QIK was designed & developed by a startup within Qantas Airways called Qadrant, as a productivity tool for use in the airline's reservation call centres. The Q.I.K. acronym was derived from its use of a separate keypad attached to the keyboard. The keys on the keypad acted as function keys. In later versions the physical keyboard was disposed of and replaced with a logical keypad represented as a quadrant on the user's screen mapped to standard QWERTY keyboard (F1-F12) function keys.

Marketed under the brands QIK, QIK-RES & QIK-CHEK these applications encapsulate airline business rules in a PC-based smart application and send the required transactions to the airline mainframe or host for processing. In doing the training time for an airline agent could be reduced from six weeks to two weeks. In addition the automation of host transactions eliminated format entry errors. This reduced the need to resend transactions and led to a reduction in mainframe usage costs for airlines.

In the early 1990s Qantas formed a joint venture operation with DMR Consulting to market QIK and other transportation IT solutions under the name of Qadrant International. In 1997 DMR Consulting purchased the remaining 49% stock of Qadrant from Qantas Airways to become the sole owner of the company. Qadrant went on to develop later versions of QIK in conjunction with Sabre Decision Technologies (SDT), at the time an AMR/American Airlines subsidiary. This joint development exercise expanded QIK from the DOS platform to the OS/2 & Windows platforms and was brought to market as QIK-II. This collaboration continued and QIK-II was migrated to the SITA's Common Use Airport platform CUTE/OS. Now the majority of QANTAS workstations use Novell's Application delivery system to deliver them an emulated version through infoconnect.

QIK-CHEK & QIK-RES are also sold as part of the TurboSabre suite by Sabre Systems. QIK applications are used by more than 70 airlines worldwide.

Airlines known to use QIK
Air Canada (transitioned to Amadeus CRS)
Air New Zealand
American Airlines
Bangkok Airways
British Airways
Caribbean Star Airlines
Caribbean Sun Airlines
Cathay Pacific Airways
Continental Airlines (transitioned to in-house developed [[EZR]])
Copa Airlines
Dragonair
EVA Airways
Finnair
Lufthansa
Qantas
Scandinavian Airlines
South African Airways
Southwest Airlines
Sun Country Airlines
Thai Airways
US Airways

References

Qantas
Travel technology